The 3rd Masterpiece is the third Korean studio album by South Korean male vocal group SG Wannabe. The record was a commercial success in South Korea, peaking at number one on the monthly MIAK albums chart for two consecutive months and sold over 316,000 copies by the end of the year. The album, along with its single "Partner for Life", received numerous awards at domestic award shows, including Album of the Year and Song of the Year at the 2006 Mnet Km Music Festival as well as the Digital Daesang prize at the 21st Golden Disc Awards.

Music videos
Similar to what they did in their second album (the music video had two parts; the first part was with the song "Crime and Punishment" ("죄와벌"), while the second part was with the song "As We Live" ("살다가")), their third album also contained two-part music videos. The first part was with their new title song, "Partner for Life" (내 사람) starring Shinhwa's Kim Dong Wan and also featuring Jeong So-Young, and the second part was released with "Slowpoke" ("느림보").

Accolades

Track listing

References

SG Wannabe albums
Stone Music Entertainment albums
2006 albums